Margaretha van Bancken (Amsterdam 1628 - Haarlem 1694) was a Dutch publisher from Haarlem.

Biography 
She was the daughter of Dirck van Bancken and Anna Noppen.<ref name=drukkers>Margarita van Bancken in Alfabetische lijst der boekdrukkers, boekverkoopers en uitgevers in Noord-Nederland sedert de uitvinding der boekdrukkunst tot den aanvang der negentiende eeuw''', by Adrianus Marinus Ledeboer, 1876 in archive.org</ref> She married the city printer on 19 April 1661, . Their son, Gerard Casteleyn continued their work as publishers in the centrally located house "In de Blije Druck" on the main square Grote Markt, Haarlem. Most of their printing commissions came from the city hall across the square, but they also ran the newspaper called Opregte Haarlemsche Courant. The painter Jan de Bray painted their double portrait sitting with clasped hands under a bust of Laurens Janszoon Coster, the Haarlem inventor of the printing press.

After her husband died she married Frederik van Vliet on 15 Sept. 1682 but continued to print works under her own name.

Works
 Haarlem pharmacopoea,  Gedrukt tot Haerlem bij Margareta van Bancken Stads-Drukster, op de Markt 1692 Ordonnantie van de Bank van Leeninge, Binnen de Stadt Haerlem, Gedruckt by Margareta van Bancken, Stadsdruckster, op de Markt, Anno 1682 Renovatie en Amplicatie op de Keure ende Ordonnantie van de Zijde-Floers. Gedruckt tot Haerlem, by Margareta van Bancken, Stads-Druckster, 1684''

See also
 List of women printers and publishers before 1800

References

1628 births
1694 deaths
Businesspeople from Haarlem
Dutch women journalists
17th-century Dutch businesspeople
17th-century publishers (people)
17th-century journalists
17th-century women journalists
17th-century Dutch businesswomen